Norbert Lambing (born 12 October 1976) is an Austrian rower. He competed in the men's quadruple sculls event at the 2000 Summer Olympics.

References

External links
 

1976 births
Living people
Austrian male rowers
Olympic rowers of Austria
Rowers at the 2000 Summer Olympics
Sportspeople from Vienna